Federico Serra Miras (born 3 October 1979, in Buenos Aires) is an Argentine rugby union player. He has played a number of times for the Argentina national rugby union team. He made his debut for the Pumas in 2003 against Chile and has gone on to represent Argentina at the 2007 Rugby World Cup in France.

Serra Miras plays club rugby for San Isidro Club in Argentina.

External links
 UAR profile

1979 births
Living people
Rugby union players from Buenos Aires
Argentine rugby union players
Rugby union fullbacks
Argentina international rugby union players
San Isidro Club rugby union players
Argentina international rugby sevens players
Male rugby sevens players